
Kurt Haehling (7 November 1893  – 20 May 1983) was a German general in the Wehrmacht during World War II.  He was a recipient of the Knight's Cross of the Iron Cross of Nazi Germany. Haehling surrendered to the Red Army in May 1945 in the Courland Pocket.  He was held until 1951.

Awards 

 Knight's Cross of the Iron Cross on 2 March 1945 as Generalmajor and commander of 126. Infanterie-Division

References

Citations

Bibliography

 

1893 births
1983 deaths
People from Węgorzewo
People from East Prussia
Nazi Party members
National Democratic Party of Germany (East Germany) politicians
Major generals of the German Army (Wehrmacht)
German Army personnel of World War I
German police officers
German prisoners of war in World War II held by the Soviet Union
Recipients of the clasp to the Iron Cross, 1st class
Recipients of the Gold German Cross
Recipients of the Knight's Cross of the Iron Cross
Recipients of the Patriotic Order of Merit in bronze